This article concerns the period 329 BC – 320 BC.

References